William Jason "Billy" Schuler (born April 27, 1990) is an American former professional soccer player.

Career

Youth and college
A resident of Allentown, New Jersey, Schuler attended Peddie School.

Schuler played three seasons over four years (redshirting his junior year after an injury) at the University of North Carolina.

Professional
Schuler signed with Hammarby IF of Sweden's Superettan after the 2011 NCAA season. He spent two years in Sweden, scoring two goals for Hammarby in 26 appearances. He signed with Major League Soccer in January 2014 and was assigned to the San Jose Earthquakes by a weighted lottery.

Schuler made his Earthquakes' debut on March 19, 2014 in a 1–1 draw against Toluca in the 2013–14 CONCACAF Champions League quarterfinals.  Schuler was released by San Jose on December 11, 2014.

On March 27, 2015, Schuler signed with Whitecaps FC 2 of the United Soccer League.

After one season in Vancouver, Schuler moved to North American Soccer League club Carolina RailHawks on January 6, 2016.

References

External links

1990 births
Living people
American soccer players
American expatriate soccer players
North Carolina Tar Heels men's soccer players
Cary Clarets players
Reading United A.C. players
Hammarby Fotboll players
San Jose Earthquakes players
Whitecaps FC 2 players
North Carolina FC players
Peddie School alumni
People from Allentown, New Jersey
People from Hamilton Township, Mercer County, New Jersey
Sportspeople from Monmouth County, New Jersey
Soccer players from New Jersey
Expatriate footballers in Sweden
USL League Two players
Superettan players
Major League Soccer players
USL Championship players
North American Soccer League players
United States men's youth international soccer players
United States men's under-20 international soccer players
2009 CONCACAF U-20 Championship players
All-American men's college soccer players
Boo FK players
Association football forwards